Bishop of Chios can refer to one of the following two Christian prelates of the Greek island of Chios:

 the Greek Orthodox Metropolitan of Chios, continuing the pre-Schism see founded in Roman times
 the Roman Catholic Bishop of Chios, established in ca. 1400